James Lindsay Smith (ca. 1816 – ca. 1883) was an American slave narrative author, minister, and shoemaker. His memoir Autobiography of James L. Smith (1881) was one of only six slave narratives published in Connecticut.

Life 
Born a slave on a plantation in Northumberland County, Virginia, Smith escaped in 1838, rowing across the Chesapeake Bay with two other fugitives in a canoe. After stops in New Castle, Philadelphia, and New York City and with the aid of abolitionists such as David Ruggles, Smith gained safety in Springfield, Massachusetts, via the Underground Railroad. In Massachusetts, he became a founding member of the African Methodist Episcopal Zion Church and attended Wilbraham Academy.

In 1842, Smith married Emmeline Minerva Platt and settled in Norwich, Connecticut, where he became a Methodist Episcopal minister and established a successful shoemaking business. His daughters, Louie and Emma, attended Norwich Free Academy and became teachers, while his son, James H. Smith, became a shoemaker like his father.

Autobiography 
In 1881, Smith published his memoirs, entitled Autobiography of James L. Smith, Including, Also, Reminiscences of Slave Life, Recollections of the War, Education of Freedmen, Causes of the Exodus, Etc. (Norwich: Press of The Bulletin Company, 1881). In this autobiography, he recounted his youth as a slave, his escape to freedom, and his later life in Massachusetts and Connecticut. In addition, he incorporated historical accounts of the American Civil War, the destruction the war inflicted on the South, the heroism of Black Union soldiers, and postwar Black emigration to the North.

Legacy 
Smith's house on School Street is a stop on Norwich's Freedom Trail and is a contributing property to Norwich's Jail Hill Historic District.

References

External links 

 Autobiography of James L. Smith – full text

1816 births
1883 deaths
People from Northumberland County, Virginia
People from Norwich, Connecticut
African-American non-fiction writers
19th-century American memoirists
People who wrote slave narratives
19th-century African-American writers
19th-century American slaves
Fugitive American slaves
American freedmen
African-American Methodist clergy
Shoemakers